Jácana is a barrio in the municipality of Yauco, Puerto Rico. Its population in 2010 was 1,690.

See also

 List of communities in Puerto Rico

References

Barrios of Yauco, Puerto Rico